Shah Qoliabad (also Romanized as Shāh Qolīābād; also known as Shāh Qolī) is a village in Mirbag-e Jonubi Rural District, in the Central District of Delfan County, Lorestan Province, Iran. At the 2006 census, its population was 65, in 14 families.

References 

Towns and villages in Delfan County